Djamila Bouhired (born c. 1935) is an Algerian militant. Bouhired is a nationalist who opposed the French colonial rule of Algeria. She was raised in a middle-class family by a Tunisian mother and an Algerian father, having attended a French school in Algeria. She would go on in her youth to join the Algerian National Liberation Front (FLN) while a student activist. There she worked as a liaison officer and personal assistant of FLN commander Yacef Saadi in Algiers.

Biography

Djamila Bouherid was born in a middle-class family in colonial Algeria. When she was still a student in a French school, she discovered her revolutionary spirit. When all the French students repeated every morning "France is our mother", Bouhired would stand up and scream "Algeria is our mother!" Of course, she was punished for this by the principal. From this time, Bouhired was drawn to the revolutionary cause. Her brothers having already been involved with the underground nationalist struggle, Bouhired was quick to join and her profile would quickly rise in stature. During the revolution she worked as a liaison agent for the commander Saadi Yacef.

In April 1957, before a large planned demonstration in the Casbah, she was captured by the French and, she claims, tortured for information about that demonstration. She did not divulge any information under torture and reportedly repeated "Algeria is our mother" while being tortured (the information is based on her own account and cannot be independently verified). Despite all of this extreme torture, Bouhired maintains that she did not confess to any wrongdoing or reveal any confidential information about the FLN. According to Bouhired, the torture went on for a total of 17 days.

In July 1957 she was tried for allegedly bombing a cafe, alongside another Algerian freedom fighter, Djamila Bouazza, aged 19. The bomb killed 11 civilians inside. At the time the French lawyer Jacques Vergès, sympathetic to the cause of the Algerian nationalists, heard of her case and decided to represent her. In what would be a historic trial, Vergès waged a public relations campaign on Bouhired's behalf and accused the French government of themselves having committed the acts charged in his defense. Despite Vergès's efforts, Bouhired was convicted and sentenced to death by guillotine.

Vergès co-wrote a plea arguing that Bouhired should not receive the death penalty. Various protest groups formed throughout Algeria and abroad rallied to convince the government not to kill Bouhired. Most notably, princess Laila Ayesha of Morocco contacted the President of France at the time, René Coty, and asked that Bouhired be spared from the death sentence. After being spared, Bouhired served a prison sentence in the Reims prison until 1962. As the end of the war drew near, she was released along with many other Algerian prisoners.

Vergès claimed to have become a target of the French colonial government, which allegedly launched several failed assassination attempts against him, including a bomb placed in his apartment and another in his car. Bouhired and Vergès were married a year after Algeria's independence, by which point Vergès had converted to Islam and taken the first name Mansoor. The couple had two children, Meriem and Liess Vergès. Bouhired separated from Vergés in 1970, after 7 years together. She became chairwoman of the Algerian Women Association in independent Algeria, and was constantly at odds with then-Algerian President Ahmed Ben Bella.

Bouhired was one of the many women fighting for emancipation and equality in the newly independent Algeria. However, economic downfall and exponential population growth caused a rise in Islamic fundamentalism, which coupled with new laws allowing for a multi-party political system ultimately resulted in civil war. Equality for women was not a priority of the government throughout this period in Algerian history. Nonetheless, Bouhired will forever be known for her work not just for Algerian independence, but also for women's rights in Algeria.

Period of imprisonment
Very few details about what transpired during her imprisonment can be independently confirmed. The only information available is what Bouhired and sources related to her have claimed afterwards. What she stated is that she was subjected to torture during her imprisonment and that the torture was not limited to her, that her brothers were also subject to torture, one of them having been tortured in front of their mother.

Present day
Djamila Bouhired resides in the capital of Algeria, Algiers, and continues to be a militant for several causes of which she participates in protests and marches, including the 2019 Algerian protests.

In popular culture
She was one of the trio of FLN female bombers depicted in the 1966 film The Battle of Algiers.  She was also depicted in the film Jamila, the Algerian (1958) by Egyptian director Youssef Chahine and in Terror's Advocate, a documentary film about Jacques Vergès. There is a song dedicated to her in Indonesian.

Honours
  : Order of the Republic – Grand Officer (2020)

References

External links
Woman of distinction
Interview, Djamila Bouhired

1935 births
Date of birth missing (living people)
Living people
Algerian guerrillas
Algerian Muslims
African women in war
Women in 20th-century warfare
Female revolutionaries
21st-century Algerian people